David Laibman (born December 25, 1942) is Professor Emeritus of Economics at Brooklyn College and the Graduate Center, City University of New York.  He received a Ph.D. in Economics in 1973 at the Graduate Faculty of the New School for Social Research in New York. His dissertation, The Invariance Condition for Value-Price Transformation in a Linear, Non-Decomposable Two-Sector Model, dealt with problems in Marxist value theory. Laibman teaches economic theory, political economy, and mathematical economics, at the undergraduate, masters, and doctoral levels at CUNY.

He is the Editor of Science & Society, a quarterly Marxist journal founded in 1936.

He is also a fingerstyle guitarist, especially its application to the ragtime music of the early twentieth century. With Eric Schoenberg, Laibman recorded The New Ragtime Guitar for Folkways Records in 1970.  His solo album, Classical Ragtime Guitar, was released by Rounder Records in 1980.  Laibman has worked with a variety of artists in the early folk world, using his advanced finger picking technique. One notable album is Way Out West by Scottish folk singer Alex Campbell, in 1963. Of note is the track "Orange Blossom Special" which showcases the talent that Laibman was developing.

He issued a DVD, Guitar Artistry of David Laibman.

Published works

Laibman is the author of five books:

Value, Technical Change and Crisis: Explorations in Marxist Economic Theory (1992)
Capitalist Macrodynamics: A Systematic Introduction (1997)
Deep History: A Study in Social Evolution and Human Potential (2007)
Political Economy After Economics: Scientific Method and Radical Imagination (2012)
Passion and Patience: Society, History, and Revolutionary Vision (2015)

References

External links
David Laibman's official website (archived copy)
The New Ragtime Guitar Album Details at Smithsonian Folkways
 Nigel Gatherer's List Of Alex Campbell Albums

1942 births
Living people
21st-century American economists
Marxian economists
Brooklyn College faculty
City University of New York faculty
Transatlantic Records artists